Yên Lạc may refer to several places in Vietnam, including:

 Yên Lạc District, a rural district of Vĩnh Phúc Province
 Yên Lạc (township), a township and capital of Yên Lạc District
 Yên Lạc, Cao Bằng, a commune of Nguyên Bình District
 Yên Lạc, Như Thanh, a commune of Như Thanh District in Thanh Hóa Province
 Yên Lạc, Thái Nguyên, a commune of Phú Lương District
 Yên Lạc, Yên Định, a commune of Yên Định District in Thanh Hóa Province
 Yên Lạc, Hòa Bình, a commune of Yên Thủy District

See also
 Yến Lạc, a township and capital of Na Rì District in Bắc Kạn Province